Dick Sheridan (born August 9, 1941) is a former American football coach and college athletics administrator.  He served as the head football coach at Furman University from 1978 to 1985 and North Carolina State University from 1986 to 1992, compiling a career college football record of 121–52–5. A 1964 graduate of the University of South Carolina, Sheridan coached the Furman Paladins to a 69–23–2 record over eight seasons. His Furman teams won six Southern Conference championships and scored two wins over NC State. In 1985, he was named the AFCA Division I-AA Coach of the Year. His record at NC State was 52–29–3 over seven seasons.  He led the Wolfpack to six bowl games. Sheridan was inducted into the College Football Hall of Fame as a coach in 2020.

A native of Augusta, Georgia, Sheridan graduated from the University of South Carolina in 1964. He began his coaching career in the high school football ranks in the state of South Carolina.  Sheridan compiled a record of 37–8–1 as a high school head coach and led Orangeburg-Wilkinson Senior High School to the Class AAAA state title in 1971.  He joined the staff at Furman in 1973 as quarterbacks and receivers coach.

Head coaching record

College

References

External links
 

1941 births
Living people
Furman Paladins athletic directors
Furman Paladins football coaches
NC State Wolfpack football coaches
High school football coaches in South Carolina
College Football Hall of Fame inductees
University of South Carolina alumni
Sportspeople from Augusta, Georgia